The 1985 season was Molde's 11th season in the top flight of Norwegian football. This season Molde competed in 1. divisjon (first tier) and the Norwegian Cup.

In the league, Molde finished in 8th position, 12 points behind winners Roenborg.

Molde participated in the 1985 Norwegian Cup. They were knocked out by Clausenengen in the First Round. The team lost 0–2 in Kristiansund and were eliminated from the competition.

Squad
Source:

Friendlies

Competitions

1. divisjon

Results summary 

Source:

Positions by round

Results

League table

Norwegian Cup

Squad statistics

Appearances and goals
Lacking information:
Appearance statistics from Norwegian Cup round 1 (11–13 players) are missing.

 
 
 

|}

Goalscorers

See also
Molde FK seasons

References

External links
nifs.no

1985
Molde